Léon Metzler (4 June 1896 – 13 March 1930) was a Luxembourgian football player who played for the club FCM Young Boys Diekirch. He played with the Luxembourgian national team at the 1920 Summer Olympics in Antwerp.

References

External links

1896 births
1930 deaths
Luxembourgian footballers
Luxembourg international footballers
Footballers at the 1920 Summer Olympics
Olympic footballers of Luxembourg

Association football forwards